Hans Peter Nordström (born July 26, 1974, in Munkfors, Sweden) is a Swedish former professional ice hockey player. He played his last seasons for Leksands IF. He also played two games for the Boston Bruins of the National Hockey League during the 1998–99 season. Internationally Nordström played for the Swedish national team at five World Championships

Playing career
Nordström started his professional ice hockey career in the Swedish elite club Leksands IF in 1994. But after only one year he left Leksand IF and signed with its rivals Färjestads BK. Nordström played with Färjetad until 1998, winning the Swedish Championship in both 1997 and 1998. Then he was drafted by the Boston Bruins in the 1998 NHL Entry Draft (3rd round, 78th pick overall).

In 1998 he signed with the Bruins. But after the training camp he became assigned to the AHL club Providence Bruins. After only playing 13 games with Providence and two games with Boston Nordström went back home to Sweden and Färjestad and playing the rest of the 1998–99 season there.

In 2002, he won his third Swedish championship with Färjestad. In 2006, he won his fourth championship, also with Färjestad.

Retirement
On May 26, 2011, Nordström announced his retirement from hockey due to injuries and said he intends to become a coach.

Career statistics

Regular season and playoffs

International

International play

Nordström represented Sweden at five World Championships: 1998 (gold), 1999 (bronze), 2000 (7th place), 2003 (silver) and 2005 (4 place).

References

1974 births
Boston Bruins draft picks
Boston Bruins players
Färjestad BK players
Leksands IF players
Living people
People from Munkfors Municipality
Providence Bruins players
Swedish expatriate ice hockey players in the United States
Swedish ice hockey left wingers
Sportspeople from Värmland County